Hasanabad (also Romanized as Ḩasanābād) is a village in Alamut-e Pain Rural District, Rudbar-e Alamut District, Qazvin County, Qazvin Province, Iran. At the 2006 census, its population was 26, in 13 families.

References 

Populated places in Qazvin County